Hartford is an unincorporated community in central Hartford Township, Trumbull County, Ohio, United States.  It has a post office with the ZIP code 44424.  It lies at the intersection of State Routes 7 and 305.

The community is part of the Youngstown-Warren-Boardman, OH-PA Metropolitan Statistical Area.

The first settlement at Hartford was made about 1799; the community takes its name from Hartford, Connecticut.

Notable people
Dave Blaney - NASCAR driver
Dale Blaney - Basketball player and Sprint Car driver
Lou Blaney - Former Sprint Car driver 
Ryan Blaney - NASCAR driver

References

Unincorporated communities in Trumbull County, Ohio
1799 establishments in the Northwest Territory
Unincorporated communities in Ohio